Viktor Baranov may refer to:

Viktor Baranov (diver) (1893–?), Russian Olympic diver
Viktor Dmitryevich Baranov (1928–2005), Soviet cross-country skier
Viktor Ilyich Baranov (1906–1996), Soviet armor commander
Viktor Kirillovich Baranov (1901–1970), Soviet cavalry commander